Stachylinoides is a fungal genus in the Harpellaceae family. The genus is monotypic, containing the single species Stachylinoides arctata, found in the gut of insect larvae in South America.

References

External links

Taxa described in 1999
Zygomycota genera
Fungi of South America
Monotypic fungi genera